The  (CvTE) is the Dutch quasi-autonomous non-governmental organisation charged with administering the exams for Dutch secondary education institutions; those exams are standardised nationwide. Named College voor Examens before 2014-08-01, the institution was founded by legislative act in 2009, and involved a merger of two state-controlled examination organisations. The organisation was severely criticized in 2013 following widespread displeasure with the exams for Dutch language and literature.

References

External links
Official website, English version
Wet College voor Examens

School examinations
Standardized tests